Moslem Uddin Ahmad (1 June 1948 – 6 February 2023) was a Bangladesh Awami League politician who was a Jatiya Sangsad member representing the Chittagong-8 constituency from January 2020 until his death.

Biography
Ahmad was appointed the vice president of the Government College of Commerce, Chittagong unit of Chhatra League in 1969. Later, he was appointed the general secretary of Chittagong unit of Chhatra League. He was also appointed the acting general secretary of Chittagong unit of Chhatra League in 1970.

Ahmad took part in the Liberation War of Bangladesh. After the Liberation of Bangladesh he was appointed the general secretary of Chittagong unit of Chhatra League in 1972. He was the incumbent president of the Chittagong South District Unit of Bangladesh Awami League.

Ahmad was elected as a member of the Jatiya Sangsad from Chittagong-8 on 13 January 2020.

Ahmad died from cancer at the Evercare Hospital Dhaka, on 6 February 2023, at the age of 74.

References

1948 births
2023 deaths 
Deaths from cancer in Bangladesh
People from Chittagong District
Awami League politicians
People of the Bangladesh Liberation War
11th Jatiya Sangsad members
Place of birth missing